California's 45th district may refer to:

 California's 45th congressional district
 California's 45th State Assembly district